Maman Suryaman (born 2 November 1962) is an Indonesian former weightlifter. He competed in the men's flyweight event at the 1984 Summer Olympics.

References

External links
 

1962 births
Living people
Indonesian male weightlifters
Olympic weightlifters of Indonesia
Weightlifters at the 1984 Summer Olympics
Place of birth missing (living people)
Asian Games medalists in weightlifting
Weightlifters at the 1982 Asian Games
Asian Games bronze medalists for Indonesia
Medalists at the 1982 Asian Games
20th-century Indonesian people
21st-century Indonesian people